Where Did the Night Fall is the fourth studio album from British electronic music act Unkle, released on .

Background
As a documentation of the work on the album, on 13 April 2009, James Lavelle, Unkle's mastermind, started an official "UNKLE Blog". According to the first post, Lavelle started to work in studio in January 2009 with Pablo Clements, James Griffith, Joel Cadbury, Gavin Clark, Matt Pierce and Mike Lowry.

Promotion
On  a single, "Heavy Drug (Surrender Sounds Mix)", was made available digitally via Beatport and iTunes. On  the download was followed by a remix EP with remixes by King Unique, Steve Mac and Future Beat Alliance.

On  a song, "Natural Selection", appeared as a streaming on Spin magazine's website, and was later made available to download as a 320 kbit/s MP3 file, via UNKLE's official website. Beginning on 31 March, a Warm Digits remix of "Natural Selection" was made available for download to customers who had pre-ordered "Where Did the Night Fall" on UNKLE's online store.

Available on the UNKLE website was a 2 disc limited edition of the album, which included a second disc containing instrumental versions of all the songs.

Where Did the Night Fall – Another Night Out
On 9 February 2011, UNKLE revealed that Where Did the Night Fall would be re-released as Where Did the Night Fall – Another Night Out. The first disc will contain the same songs that are on the original album but the second disc contains material from two of UNKLE's previous EPs, plus a number of exclusive and rare tracks. It was released on 11 April 2011.

The standard edition comes packaged as a double jewel case with a 16-page booklet. The limited edition comes in a gold outer slipcase featuring a fully re-worked 16-page board book and 32-page booklet with new exclusive shots from the original photo shoot with Warren Du Preez and Nick Thornton Jones.

Track listing

Standard
 "Nowhere" – 0:40
 "Follow Me Down" (featuring Sleepy Sun) – 4:23
 "Natural Selection" (featuring The Black Angels) – 4:10
 "Joy Factory" (featuring Autolux) – 3:59
 "The Answer" (featuring Big in Japan) – 4:40
 "On a Wire" (featuring ELLE J) – 4:52
 "Falling Stars" (featuring Gavin Clark) – 5:48
 "Heavy Drug" – 1:13
 "Caged Bird" (featuring Katrina Ford of Celebration) – 5:08
 "Ablivion" – 4:29
 "The Runaway" (featuring ELLE J) – 3:45
 "Ever Rest" (featuring Joel Cadbury of South) – 4:21
 "The Healing" (featuring Gavin Clark) – 4:27
 "Another Night Out" (featuring Mark Lanegan) – 5:12
 "Close Your Eyes" (featuring ELLE J) – 5:25 (available on the Australian edition)

Limited edition
 "Nowhere (Instrumental)" – 4:10
 "Follow Me Down (Instrumental)" – 4:23
 "Natural Selection (Instrumental)" – 4:10
 "Joy Factory (Instrumental)" – 3:59
 "The Answer (Instrumental)" – 4:40
 "On a Wire (Instrumental)" – 4:52
 "Falling Stars (Instrumental)" – 5:48
 "Heavy Drug (Instrumental)" – 4:24
 "Caged Bird (Instrumental)" – 5:08
 "Ablivion (Instrumental)" – 4:29
 "The Runaway (Instrumental)" – 3:45
 "Ever Rest (Instrumental)" – 4:21
 "The Healing (Instrumental)" – 4:27
 "Another Night Out (Instrumental)" – 5:12

Another Night Out
 "Somewhere" – 1:12
 "In My Mind" (featuring Gavin Clark) – 4:44
 "Money and Run" (featuring Nick Cave) – 5:16
 "The Dog Is Black" (featuring Liela Moss) – 5:03
 "Only the Lonely" (Over Dub) – 4:27
 "Wash the Love Away" (featuring Gavin Clark) – 5:12
 "Sunday Song" (featuring Rachel Fannan) – 6:46
 "With You in My Head" (featuring The Black Angels) – 5:11
 "Country Tune" (featuring Gavin Clark) – 5:16
 "Not a Sound" – 5:15
 "When the Lights Go Out/We Own the Night" – 5:36
 "Every Single Prayer" (featuring Gavin Clark) – 5:13
 "Forever" (featuring Ian Astbury) – 4:26 (Available on the Australian and Japanese Edition)

Personnel
Adapted from AllMusic.

Unkle
 James Lavelle – art direction, editing, backing vocals
 Pablo Clements – drum engineering, editing, engineering, keyboards, programming, synthesizer, vocal engineering

Featured artists
 Aidan Lavelle – additional production, engineering, keyboards, mixing production, piano, programming, synthesizer
 Penny Ainscow – violin
 Sam Aylward – violin
 Chris Goss – associate producer, guitar, keyboards, synthesizer, backing vocals
 Dave Bateman – additional production, bass, engineering, keyboards, synthesizer
 Sam Bell – drum programming
 Joshua Blanchard – vocal engineering
 Christian Bland – organ
 Joshua Block – drums
 Freddie Bols – trumpet
 Jules Buckley – orchestral arrangements, string arrangements
 Joel Cadbury – bass, guitar, keyboards, piano, synthesizer, vocals, backing vocals
 Gavin Clark – vocals, backing vocals
 Nozomi Cohen – viola
 Nicki Davenport – Double bass
 Elle. J – vocals, backing vocals
 Katrina Ford – vocals
 Graham Fox – drums
 Mark Grainger – tuba
 James Griffith – additional production, bass, engineering, guitar, keyboards, piano, programming, synthesizer, backing vocals
 Alan Hardiman – trombone
 Steven Haynes – trombone
 Heritage Orchestra – brass, orchestral arrangements, orchestra production, string arrangements, strings
 Laura Holt – viola
 Sam Jacobs – French horn
 Simon James – keyboards, synthesizer
 Nat Jones – violin
 Mark Lanegan – vocals
 Jennymay Logan – violin
 Michael Lowry – drums, backing vocals
 Alex Maas – vocals
 Kit Massey – violin
 Andrew McCormack – string arrangements
 Mike Pelanconi – drum engineering
 Matthew Pierce – Fender Rhodes, keyboards, synthesizer, vocals
 Ruston Pomeroy – violin
 Rhian Porter – cello
 Tom Richards – orchestral arrangements
 Ben Trigg – cello
 Rachel Williams – vocals
 Mark Wood – French Horn
 Steven Young – bass
 Tim Young – keyboards, synthesizer, backing vocals

Autolux
 Carla Azar – drums, engineering, percussion, vocals
 Eugene Goreshter – bass
 Greg Edwards – bass, engineering, omnichord, vocals

Sleepy Sun
 Brian Tice – drums

Production
 Joseph Bennett – set design
 Zowie Broach – costume design
 Steve "Dub" Jones – mixing
 Danielle Epworth – make-Up assistant
 Warren Du Preez – art direction, photography
 Kiera Gormley – model
 Dan Goudie – Pro-Tools, vocal engineer
 Leonie Edwards Jones – producer
 Jerome Hunt – assistant photographer
 Kyle Hunt – vocal engineer
 Soichi Inagaki – assistant hair stylist
 Brian Kirkby – costume design
 Nick Thornton Jones – art direction, photography
 Mike Marsh – mastering
 Alex Box – make-up
 Sebastian Lewsley – engineer, vocal engineer
 Maike Ludenbach – model
 Rob Riley – engineer
 Raphael Salley – hair stylist
 Lindsey Thurlow – producer
 Ameena Kara Callender – assistant hair stylist
 Ben Drury – art direction, design, lettering
 Steve Wright – engineer
 Eric Weaver – vocal engineer
 Chris Wheeler – orchestra production
 Nicole Stillman – assistant photographer
 Laurence Aldridge – Pro-Tools
 Sean Antanaitis – engineer, vocal engineer

Charts

References

External links
Unkle Blog

2010 albums
Unkle albums